With All Her Heart is a 1920 British silent drama film directed by Frank Wilson and starring Milton Rosmer, Mary Odette and Jack Vincent. It was based on the 1901 novel by the popular writer Charles Garvice. Many reviewers recommended the film on the strength of the original book.

Cast
 Milton Rosmer as Geoffrey Bell 
 Mary Odette as Cottie 
 Jack Vincent as Sidney Bassington 
 J. Hastings Batson as Earl of Stanborough 
 Harry Gilbey as Solicitor

References

Bibliography
 Bamford, Kenton. Distorted Images: British National Identity and Film in the 1920s. I.B. Tauris, 1999.
 Low, Rachael. History of the British Film, 1918-1929. George Allen & Unwin, 1971.

External links

1920 films
1920 drama films
British drama films
British silent feature films
Films directed by Frank Wilson
Films based on British novels
Films set in England
British black-and-white films
1920s English-language films
1920s British films
Silent drama films